Screaming is an extended vocal technique that is popular in "aggressive" music genres such as heavy metal, punk rock, and noise music and others. It is common in the more extreme subgenres of heavy metal, such as death and black metal as well as many other subgenres.

Genres

Classical and experimental music 
Although screams are often suggested in stories performed in the grand opera tradition, they were never performed literally, always being sung. The first significant example of an actual scream in an opera is in Alban Berg's Wozzeck (1922), where the eponymous character screams "Murder! Murder!" in the fourth scene of Act III. Even more strikingly, Berg's unfinished Lulu, written mainly in 1934, features a blood-curdling scream as the heroine is murdered by Jack the Ripper in the closing moments of the final scene. In Mascagni's 1890 Cavalleria rusticana the final line "They've murdered Turiddu!" is spoken, not sung, and often accompanied by a scream.

Other composers have employed screaming in avant garde works in the twentieth century, typically in the post-World War II era, as composers began to explore more experimental compositional techniques and nonstandard use of musical instruments (including the voice). Composers who have used shouting or screaming in their works include Luciano Berio, George Crumb, Gyorgy Ligeti, Charles Mingus, Meredith Monk and Karlheinz Stockhausen. The use of hoarse vocals in choral and orchestral works continues today in some productions such as film scores; mainstream examples include some works by Don Davis and Wojciech Kilar.

Experimental music genres often feature screamed vocals if vocals are employed in the music, as a form of alternative expression rather than conventional singing. The song "Paralyzed" by the outsider musician the Legendary Stardust Cowboy is a prime example of the use of screaming vocals in experimental music. Noise music is notable for screamed vocals, examples being the well-known noise artist Masonna and the vocalist Maja Ratkje.

Gospel
Several gospel recordings of the mid-1920s include screaming, such as in the Reverend J.M. Gates "I'm a Soldier in the Army of the Lord" or Reverend J.C. Burnette's "The Downfall of Nebuchadnezzar". They are essentially acapella. The main singer leads with the scream and shout and a group respond following the traditional African call and response.
Bessie Johnson's "He Got Better Things For You" with her group Memphis Sanctified Singers, released in 1929, can be considered the first gospel song featuring screaming backed by an instrument (acoustic guitar).

Blues
Blind Willie Johnson is known to be the pioneer of screaming in blues music. In 1928, he performed the song "Jesus Is Coming Soon" with a soft screaming style. The vaudeville blues singer Ora Alexander was also one of the earliest blues vocalist recorded to perform screaming with her song "You've Got To Save That Thing" in 1931.

Kansas City blues musicians began shouting in order to be heard over music in the loud dancehalls. The shouted vocals eventually became a characteristic for these bands. Key members of this movement include Big Joe Turner and Howlin' Wolf. One of the first known R&B songs to utilize screaming vocals is said to be Screamin' Jay Hawkins' "I Put a Spell on You" (1956).

Rock and roll
Rock and roll (before the advent of heavy metal and punk rock) employed occasional brief screaming bits. In the 1950s, one principal screamer was Little Richard, beginning with his "Tutti Frutti" (1955). In 1955 at Sun Records, Elvis Presley used his scream  on numerous cuts like "Trying to Get to You". He also screamed some of the lyrics to "Jailhouse Rock" in its original 1957 recording, although recordings of live performances of the song in Presley's later career featured him strictly singing the words. Tina Turner used screaming in "A Fool in Love" (1960), her first recording as a lead singer, on which Juggy Murray commented, "All of those blues singers sounded like dirt. Tina sounded like screaming dirt. It was a funky sound."

The first take of the Beatles' recording of "Twist and Shout" for Please Please Me (1963) was the only complete take, since John Lennon's voice was torn up, partly by the screams that peppered the song. Lennon, inspired by Arthur Janov's Primal Scream therapy, screamed in his later songs "Mother" and "Well Well Well" on John Lennon/Plastic Ono Band.

Heavy metal
While occasional screaming has been used for effect in heavy metal since the genre's dawn in the late 1960s (with singers such as Robert Plant, Ian Gillan and Rob Halford employing the technique frequently), screaming as a normal method of lyrical delivery first came to prominence in heavy metal as part of the thrash metal explosion of the 1980s.

Thrash metal was influenced both by heavy metal and by hardcore punk, the latter of which often incorporated shouted or screamed vocals. The first instance of screaming in Heavy metal used as a constant delivery of lyrics was Chuck Schuldiner of the band Death. Musicologist Robert Walser notes, "The punk influence shows up in the music's fast tempos and frenetic aggressiveness and in critical or sarcastic lyrics delivered in a menacing growl." It should however be noted that the vocal delivery of thrash metal is incredibly diverse; some bands such as Anthrax use much cleaner vocals, early Metallica uses very hardcore punk influenced vocals while other bands such as Slayer use more "evil" shouts and yells, bearing little resemblance to hardcore punk. More recent bands within metal's various subgenres, such as Carnifex, are known for making use of multiple variations of both screaming and growling.

Screaming in some subgenres of heavy metal music is typically demanding and guttural. The death growl is common in death metal.

Separate forms of extreme metal vocalization can be found in black metal, which has a higher-pitched sound, and deathcore, which uses either a low growl or a high pitched scream.

Death metal, in particular, is associated with growled vocals. Death metal, which tends to be darker and more morbid than thrash metal, features vocals that attempt to evoke chaos and misery by being "usually very deep, guttural, and unintelligible." Natalie Purcell notes, "Although the vast majority of death metal bands use very low, beast-like, almost indiscernible growls as vocals, many also have high and screechy or operatic vocals, or simply deep and forcefully sung vocals."

Music sociologist Deena Weinstein has noted of death metal, "Vocalists in this style have a distinctive sound, growling and snarling rather than singing the words. Making ample use of the voice distortion box, they sound as if they had gargled with hydrochloric acid."

The progressively more forceful enunciation of metal vocals has been noted, from heavy metal to thrash metal to death metal.

Black metal
Black metal music in particular has a definitive "screaming" style which constitutes a vast majority of the genre's vocal work, though this is done in varying degrees. Some black metal acts use this approach as a simple rasping sound, but others use a louder, more "grim" scream to emulate the cold, evil, and frightening atmosphere black metal would portray. Vocalists like Ihsahn of Emperor, Grutle Kjellson of Enslaved and Pest of Gorgoroth use loud screaming in their vocal work, while other vocalists take differing approaches; for example: Shagrath of Dimmu Borgir once used a style on par with loud roaring in the band's Enthrone Darkness Triumphant days, and vocalists such as John Gossard of the San Francisco band Weakling and Pasi of the Finnish band Darkwoods My Betrothed used a style that sounded more like wailing mixed with the genre's present screams.

The American black metal group Wolves in the Throne Room employ long shrilling screams influenced by Gorgoroth's early works.

Some folk noir bands (often ones that have come from the black metal scene originally) use guttural growls and shrieks occasionally, mostly for dramatic effect. Examples include Empyrium and Uaral.

Metalcore
Metalcore is a genre that employs both screamed and clean vocals. Screaming became more of a traditional standard for the genre in the early 1990s with bands such as Earth Crisis and Converge who also took use of this vocal style frequently. Some bands employ a dual vocalist set up, one who performs traditional sung vocals, while another is dedicated to just screamed vocals, such as The Devil Wears Prada.

Greg Puciato of The Dillinger Escape Plan is known for "insane" and "constant" screams.

Deathcore
Like metalcore, deathcore is known for its use of aggressive screaming, though at a much more extreme rate. Vocal stylings of the genre range from the low death growls of vocalists such as Phil Bozeman of Whitechapel, to the high pitched screams from the likes of Alex Koehler of Chelsea Grin. Some bands relating to the deathcore genre perform what is called "pig squealing", which is a squealing vocal technique resembling that of a pig. Early albums by deathcore bands such as Job for a Cowboy and Despised Icon employed the use of pig squeal vocals, but abandoned it on later material.

Alternative metal and nu metal
Alternative metal and nu metal bands sometimes employ screaming as well. Jonathan Davis screams in most of Korn's earlier songs. American nu metal band Otep frontwoman Otep Shamaya is also known for her usage of death growls as well as high pitch screaming. Serj Tankian occasionally performs both exhale and inhale screams, which are especially notable on System of a Down's first two albums. Limp Bizkit sometimes uses screamed vocals, especially on songs from their first album. Some bands combine screaming techniques with clean vocals to create a concrete sound with a noticeable change in tone, Chino Moreno of Deftones, who is famed for combining his high-pitched, aggressive screams with his calm and melodic singing, is a clear example of the concept alongside singers such as Corey Taylor of Slipknot.

Linkin Park's singer Chester Bennington screamed in many Linkin Park songs, most notably the 17-second scream in the track "Given Up". Michael Barnes of Red has screamed in a majority of the songs the band has done, most notably in "Let Go", for 13 seconds straight.

Hardcore and punk rock
Yelling and shouting vocals are common in a type of punk rock known as hardcore. Early punk was distinguished by a general tendency to eschew traditional singing techniques in favor of a more direct, harsh style which accentuated meaning rather than beauty. The logical extension of this aesthetic is shouting, and in hardcore, vocals are usually shouted in a frenetic manner similar to rapping or football chants, often accompanied by "gang vocals" in which a group of people shout along with the vocalist (this style is very common in punk rock, most prominently Oi!, street punk and hardcore punk).

Health concerns
Some vocalists who have employed musical screaming have had problems with their throats, voices, vocal cords, and have even experienced major migraines from screaming incorrectly. Some vocalists of metal bands have had to stop screaming, making music altogether, or even undergo surgery due to screaming in harmful ways that damage the vocal cords. One example is Sonny Moore (also known as Skrillex) of the band From First to Last, who had to leave the band as vocalist due to the damage it was causing to his vocal cords, which required surgery to repair. Kyo of Dir En Grey, noted for his extreme vocal range incorporating both clean and harsh vocals, was hospitalised for vocal nodule dysphonia in 2012, though has since recovered. However, with proper technique, screaming can be done without harm to the vocal cords.

See also
 Death growl
 Screaming
 Harsh voice
 Creaky voice
 Ingressive sound
 Pharyngealization
 Epiglottal trill

References

Heavy metal performance techniques
Singing techniques
Black metal
Metalcore
Grindcore
Hardcore punk
Punk rock